D-Freaked It is the fifth album released by Domino. It was released on June 19, 2001, for Big Whale Records and was produced by Domino. After two unsuccessful albums in a row, (Dominology and Remember Me?) this marked Domino's return to the Billboard charts, peaking at No. 95 on the Top R&B/Hip-Hop Albums chart.

Track listing
"Intro"- 1:35
"Like That"- 3:49
"Parking Lot Pimpin'"- 4:19
"Dollar Bill Shit"- 4:06
"Flossin'"- 4:22
"Chocolate Girl"- 4:26
"Toes Up"- 3:50
"Unphuckwitable"- 3:57
"4 My Peeps"- 4:43
"G Spot Touchin'"- 4:46
"Don't Hate Me"- 3:20 (Featuring Krishna Das)
"Brand New"- 4:11
"D-Freaked It"- 4:33
"Like That" (Icon Mix)- 3:50

References

2001 albums
Domino (rapper) albums